Anthony T. Millard (born 13 Nov 1961) was a multiple champion trainer in South Africa. He relocated to Hong Kong in 1999. He ended the 2010/11 season with 37 winners for an overall total of 345.

Significant horses
 Ambitious Dragon
 Sweet Sanette

Performance

References
The Hong Kong Jockey Club – Trainer Information
The Hong Kong Jockey Club http://www.hkjc.com/home/english/index.asp

Hong Kong horse trainers
Living people
1961 births